Napoleon Louis Josef Jérôme Bonaparte (16 July 1864 – 14 October 1932) was a member of the Bonaparte family, a lieutenant-general in the Russian Army and governor of the province of Yerevan in 1905.

Early life 
Louis Bonaparte, as he was known, was born in Meudon, France. He was the second son of Prince Napoléon Bonaparte, who was the son of Napoleon's brother Jérôme Bonaparte and of Princess Maria Clotilde of Savoy, daughter of Victor Emmanuel II of Italy.

Life 
He was educated with his older brother Victor, Prince Napoléon, then lived a quiet life in Paris at the home of his aunt Mathilde Bonaparte. His father directed him to a military career. As a relative of Napoleon Bonaparte, he was not allowed to join the French Army, so he became a lieutenant in the Italian Army in Verona, with the approval of his uncle, King Umberto I of Italy.

Because of anti-French sentiment in the Italian Army, he left Italy in 1890 and enlisted in the Russian Army. In 1895 he was promoted to colonel. In 1902 he was stationed in the Caucasus. When riots broke out in 1905 between Armenians and Azeris in Yerevan, he was named governor of the province of Yerevan and ordered to restore order.

In 1910, he retired from the Russian Army as a lieutenant-general and moved to the family estate in Prangins, Switzerland. At the request of the Russian tsar, he became liaison officer for the Russian Army with the Third Italian Army, led by his cousin Prince Emanuele Filiberto, Duke of Aosta.

In 1917, he returned to Prangins, though his later travels included trips to Japan and the United States. 

He died in 1932 from a stroke in Prangins, Switzerland. He never married and had no children.

Ancestry

Sources 

 Armenia, the Survival of a Nation by Christopher Walker 
 Dictionnaire du Second Empire (1995) by Jean Tulard 
 Fire and sword in the Caucasus by Luigi Villari (pages 216–228)

Footnotes 

1864 births
1932 deaths
Louis
Imperial Russian Army personnel
People from Meudon
Italian Army personnel
Burials at the Basilica of Superga